Congregation Kol Shofar is a Conservative synagogue founded in 1962 and located in Tiburon, California. The congregation is led by  Rabbis Susan Leider and Paul Steinberg, both of whom were ordained by the Ziegler School of Rabbinic Studies.

History
In the 1960s and 1970s, Kol Shofar was a nomadic congregation, meeting in various locations around Marin County. In 1984 it acquired its current location at 215 Blackfield Drive in Tiburon, California. The Blackfield location was previously home to Reedland Woods Middle School from 1970 to 1976.

Expansion

In 2006, Kol Shofar submitted plans to expand its synagogue space. The Tiburon Neighborhood Coalition opposed the construction, citing the traffic and noise impact due to the size of a new multi-purpose room and a proposed 27 additional events with up to 250 persons. That summer, the Tiburon Planning Commission rejected the expansion plans, claiming that Kol Shofar refused to engage in compromise discussions.  As a result of the Planning Commission's rejection, the issue was brought to the attention of the town council who later that year approved a reduced synagogue expansion plan with restrictions on hours, parking, and number of events, as well as reducing the size of the social hall by 15 percent. Kol Shofar argued that Tiburon's restrictions would violate the federal Religious Land Use and Institutionalized Persons Act (RLUIPA), which prohibits "substantial burdens" on the exercise of religion by government regulations. The Becket Fund for Religious Liberty threatened litigation on behalf of Kol Shofar depending on the outcome. Both Tiburon and Kol Shofar were sued by the Coalition in March 2007, alleging environmental and land-use violations.

In 2008, a Marin Superior Court judge ruled in favor of the expansion, and the Coalition filed an appeal with the 1st District Court of Appeal. The appeal was ultimately dropped later that same year, and Kol Shofar was able to proceed, agreeing not to seek repayment of court costs.

Construction
Construction on the new space began in April 2009. The congregation held services in neighboring Westminster Presbyterian Church from February 8, 2009 until August 27, 2010. On August 27, 2010, the congregation held its first Shabbat services in its renovated sanctuary. The next day Kol Shofar held a reopening celebration. Members of the larger bay area Jewish community were in attendance. The project costed 17.5 million dollars, adding a brand new  social hall, additional parking, and four class rooms, as well as a renovated sanctuary space. Herman Coliver Locus Architecture of San Francisco designed the project.

Clergy
 Rabbi Paul Steinberg (2017 – )
 Rabbi Susan Leider (2012 – )

Past clergy
 Rabbi Chai Levy (2002 – 2018)
 Rabbi Lavey Darby (1991 – 2010)
 Rabbi David White (1977 – 1991)
 Rabbi Daniel B. Kohn
 Rabbi Jacob Milgrom (     - 1975)
 Rabbi Aryeh Wineman (1975-1977)

References

External links
Kol Shofar's website

Conservative synagogues in California
Synagogues in Marin County, California
Tiburon, California